Gobioclinus bucciferus, the Puffcheek blenny, is a species of labrisomid blenny native to the western Atlantic Ocean and the Caribbean Sea. This species can reach a length of  TL. This species can also be found in the aquarium trade.

References

bucciferus
Fish of the Caribbean
Fish described in 1868
Fish of the Atlantic Ocean